Allotropa virgata is in the family Ericaceae and is the only species of the genus Allotropa. It is a perennial plant that gets its common names from the distinct white and red or maroon stripes along its erect peduncle. A. virgata are nongreen as they lack chlorophyll, instead obtaining nutrition from neighboring green plants through a fungal intermediate.

Its common names include sugarstick, candystriped allotropa and barber's pole.

Range
Allotropa virgata was first collected by the Wilkes Expedition in the Cascade Mountains of Washington in the late 1800s. It is found in the oak, coniferous and hardwood forests of the Pacific Northwest. It grows from 75 to 3000 meters in elevation in the High Sierra Nevada, High Cascade Range and up through British Columbia. There is also suitable habitat in Idaho, Nevada, and Montana.

Ecology 
Allotropa virgata feeds primarily on matsutake mushroom (Tricholoma matsutake) mycelium, and also possibly that of the similar Tricholoma magnivelare. Allotropa virgata was listed as a 'sensitive' species in 1998. It is a clonal species that spreads through its extensive lateral root system, to lengths up to 4 feet and 2 feet deep. Because it spreads underground through buds on the lateral roots, it is able to survive ground fires if the host tree of its fungal hosts are not killed as well.

Allotropa virgata is pollinated by bumblebees, sweat bees, and some Lepidoptera species.

Description
Allotropa virgata has an underground stem (rhizome) with brittle roots. The scale-like leaves are along the striped peduncle with a raceme-like inflorescence. The peduncle is persistent after the seeds have been dispersed and tends to turn brown. The bracts of the inflorescence are less than 3 cm and the pedicels are not recurved. The stems stand up to 40 centimeters tall. Standing dead stems, which darken to a reddish-brown with no white, from prior years' growth are often present.

The individual flowers generally do not have sepals but if they do, have 2 to 4. Often the petals of the flower are incorrectly considered sepals. The corolla has 5 white petals in a cup shape, all petals are free and concave. From the corolla there are 10 protruding stamens, maroon in color, with dehiscent anthers. The superior ovary has 5 chambers with a style under 2 mm and a disk-like stigma. The short nectary is disk-like as well with 10 lobes.

The fruit of A. virgata are capsules which dehisce lengthwise through the ovary wall near the center of each of the 5 chambers. This dehiscence allows the many fusiform seeds from each chamber to be dispersed.

Etymology
Allotropa is derived from Greek and means 'different nourishment' (allo– 'different', 'other'; tropus– 'nourishment').

Further reading

 Hickman, J.C. 1993. The Jepson Manuel: Higher Plants of California. University of California Press: 545
 www.calflora.org
 Berkeley University's CalPhotos

References

Monotropoideae
Monotypic Ericaceae genera
Flora of California
Flora of the United States